Sebastopol is a ghost town in Ottawa County, Michigan. It was founded with the opening of a post office on March 17, 1855. Its first postmaster was Alexander Ullson. The post office closed on December 5, 1859.

Sources 

Populated places established in 1853
Former populated places in Ottawa County, Michigan
Ghost towns in Michigan